Vance Edmund Stewart (born 28 October 1948) is a former New Zealand rugby union player and coach. A lock, Stewart represented Canterbury at a provincial level, and was a member of the New Zealand national side, the All Blacks, in 1976 and 1979. He played 12 matches for the All Blacks but did not appear in any official tests. He went on to coach Canterbury from 1993 to 1996, and was the inaugural  coach in 1996.

Stewart was born in Christchurch on 28 October 1948, the son of Vance and Uta Stewart, and was educated at St Bede's College.

References

1948 births
Living people
Rugby union players from Christchurch
People educated at St Bede's College, Christchurch
New Zealand rugby union players
New Zealand international rugby union players
Canterbury rugby union players
Māori All Blacks players
Rugby union locks
New Zealand rugby union coaches